Iranians in Romania (or Iranian Romanians) are immigrants from Iran to Romania as well as their descendants of Iranian heritage or background.

History
Relations between the Iranians and Romania go back centuries ago, when current territories of Romania were part of the Persian Empire. 
In modern times, Iranians started to immigrate to Romania since Communist times, mostly as students. After the fall of the Communism, Iranian businessmen came to Romania to start business. Due to the fact that Romania's workforce has decreased due to emigration, Iranian skilled workers also started to come to Romania. There is also a small but growing number of Iranian assylium seekers and refugees living in Romania. 
As of 2019 there are at least 2,000 Iranian-born people living in Romania.

See also
 Iranian diaspora

References

Romania
Ethnic groups in Romania